is a Japanese judoka. He was born in Kishiwada, Osaka, and began judo at the age of 8. He entered the Japan Racing Association after graduating from Kokushikan University. On December 9, 2007, he defeated world champion Teddy Riner at Jigoro Kano Cup Judo World Grandprix.

References

External links
 
 

1983 births
Living people
Japanese male judoka
People from Kishiwada, Osaka
Universiade medalists in judo
Universiade bronze medalists for Japan
Medalists at the 2003 Summer Universiade
20th-century Japanese people
21st-century Japanese people